The esports department of Panathinaikos was established on 29 December 2016. In order to launch the team, the club partnered with CowboyTV, a local game tournament organiser and owner of professional eSports team Void Gaming (established in late 2012). The latter will remain active as the youth academy and official scrim partner of the club for League of Legends.

Information
The first teams that were announced will competed in the following titles: League of Legends, Hearthstone, and FIFA.

The establishment of an NBA 2K team was announced on 2 April 2020.

Current

NBA 2K

FIFA 20

Hearthstone

eFootball

Coaches

Defunct teams

Final League of Legends roster

Honours

Domestic 

 1 League Of Legends, Gameathlon: 2018
 1 League Of Legends, TIF: 2018
 1 PUBG, Gameathlon: 2018
 1 FIFA 20, VPG Super League: 2020
 1 Greek National Championship in eFootball of the Hellenic Federation of Pro Evolution Soccer: 2021
 1 Greek National Championship in FIFA21 VGL Superliga Greece: 2021
 1 Greek Cup FIFA21 VGL: 2021
 1 Greek National Championship in PUBG (Greek Series, PGS Summer Showdown): 2022
 2 Championships  Rainbow Six Siege ( Gameathlon ): 2022, 2023

International 

 1 Cup HFP Gaming - Esports Leagues (HFP LEGENDARY CUP): 2022

References

External links
  of the department 
 Official website of the club
 CowboyTV _ eSports Entertainment and Gaming Events Greece
 Page of "eGaming" tournament

Panathinaikos A.O.
2016 establishments in Greece
Esports teams based in Greece
Hearthstone teams
PlayerUnknown's Battlegrounds teams
FIFA (video game series) teams
NBA 2K teams
Defunct and inactive League of Legends teams